Robert Stevenson was a Scottish footballer who played as a inside left for Morton, St Mirren, Clydebank and Arthurlie. He left Morton the year before the Greenock club won the Scottish Cup in 1922, but was a regular member of their team in the period around World War I when they finished in the top four of the Scottish Football League table for six seasons running (Stevenson missed one of these campaigns entirely, likely as a result of wartime commitments). He did take part in both of the Navy and Army War Fund Shield finals, the first of which in 1915 Morton won by defeating Rangers and the second in 1918 which they lost to Celtic. After he moved to Renfrewshire derby rivals St Mirren, Stevenson  quickly struck up a fruitful partnership with fellow new signing Dunky Walker, who finished as the top scorer across European club football in their first season together.

References

19th-century births
Year of birth missing
20th-century deaths
Year of death missing
Scottish footballers
Association football inside forwards
Petershill F.C. players
Scottish Junior Football Association players
St Mirren F.C. players
Clydebank F.C. (1914) players
Arthurlie F.C. players
Greenock Morton F.C. players
Scottish Football League players